Gabriel Bogdan Simion (born 22 May 1998) is a Romanian professional footballer who plays as a midfielder for Liga I team Universitatea Cluj.

Career statistics

Club

Honours
FCSB
Cupa Ligii: 2015–16
Supercupa României runner-up: 2020

References

External links
 

1998 births
Living people
People from Călărași
Romanian footballers
Association football defenders
Liga I players
Liga II players
Cypriot First Division players
FC Steaua București players
FC Steaua II București players
LPS HD Clinceni players
ASC Daco-Getica București players
FC Dunărea Călărași players
FC Astra Giurgiu players
Aris Limassol FC players
FC Universitatea Cluj players